The Joe DiMaggio Highway, commonly called the West Side Highway and formerly the Miller Highway, is a  mostly surface section of New York State Route 9A (NY 9A), running from West 72nd Street along the Hudson River to the southern tip of Manhattan in New York City. It replaced the West Side Elevated Highway, built between 1929 and 1951, which was shut down in 1973 due to neglect and lack of maintenance, and was dismantled by 1989. North of 72nd Street the roadway continues north as the Henry Hudson Parkway.

The current highway was complete by 2001, but required reconstruction after the September 11 attacks that year, when the collapse of the World Trade Center caused debris to fall onto the surrounding areas, damaging the highway. It uses the surface streets that existed before the elevated highway was built: West Street, Eleventh Avenue and Twelfth Avenue. A short section of Twelfth Avenue still runs between 125th and 138th Streets, under the Riverside Drive Viaduct. Eleventh Avenue is a separate street north of 22nd Street. The portion between West 42nd Street and Canal Street is part of the Lincoln Highway.

Route description
The highway is a six-to-eight lane urban boulevard, with the northernmost section, from 59th Street to 72nd Street (where it becomes the Henry Hudson Parkway), elevated above a former rail yard adjacent to tracks still used by Amtrak. Trucks and buses are allowed only on the surface section. The West Side Highway's surface section takes three names: West Street from the Battery Park Underpass north to Tenth Avenue, then Eleventh Avenue to 22nd Street, and finally Twelfth Avenue to 59th Street.

West Street
The highway begins from Battery Park close to the mouth of the Brooklyn Battery Tunnel where it also accepts traffic from the southern terminus of the Franklin D. Roosevelt East River Drive.  From there, the route passes close to the site of the World Trade Center at Vesey Street.  The route continues with this name passing by numerous piers along the Hudson River until Gansevoort Street in the Meatpacking District where it becomes Eleventh Avenue.

Eleventh Avenue

Eleventh Avenue begins just north of the intersection with Tenth Avenue. The highway is concurrent with Eleventh Avenue north of this point, passing by the 14th Street Park at 14th Street.  The highway continues with this name alongside the Chelsea Piers until it reaches 22nd Street where the highway branches off from Eleventh Avenue onto Twelfth Avenue.

Twelfth Avenue

At 22nd Street, the highway continues as Twelfth Avenue passing by the Chelsea Waterside Park.  It passes just west of the Javits Center from 34th Street to 38th Street and over the Lincoln Tunnel at 39th Street.  The road continues past the Intrepid Sea, Air & Space Museum and Piers 84 to 92, a major cruise ship terminal building.  At 54th Street, Twelfth Avenue attains a highway with service roads character, with the service roads running as far as 59th Street. From there, Twelfth Avenue becomes elevated and at 72nd Street, the highway becomes the Henry Hudson Parkway.

West Side Elevated Highway

Various proposals circulated in the 1920s to build an expressway on the west side.  Among the proposals:

 Rail/Highway Double Decker – The New York Central Railroad proposed building a highway/rail double decked highway from 72nd Street to Canal Street, which would be constructed privately at no cost to the city.  It would eliminate 106 grade crossings over 84 blocks.  It ran into opposition because of fears that it would create a rail monopoly.
 Hencken's Ten-story Train/Car/Office/People Mover – Engineer John Hencken proposed an exotic ten-story complex with a rail line underground, a road at street level, and a people mover built above that, topped by ten stories of apartments and offices. The highway would run on top of the ten-story buildings. A similar alternative was offered by Benjamin Battin.

Manhattan borough president Julius Miller said that something had to be done right away and ultimately pushed through the plan for the West Side Elevated Highway, which was to eventually bear his name. The proposal immediately ran into stiff opposition.  The City Club and New York City Mayor James J. Walker objected to the highway on the grounds that it would block waterfront-bound freight traffic. At the time, West Street exhibited a "daily avalanche of freight and passengers in traffic", and was "walled by an unbroken line of bulkhead sheds and dock structures" blocking the view not only of the river, but even of the ships being serviced, and the commerce carried out on those piers and slips was vital to the economic health of the city. They believed that the plans should wait until the surface railroad tracks were removed in the area, at which point the elevated highway might not be necessary. Many objected that it would be ugly. Finally, in 1929, construction started, and the section between Canal Street and West 72nd Street was completed in 1937, with a "Southern Extension" to the Brooklyn–Battery Tunnel completed in 1951.

Robert Moses proposals
Having begun at Canal Street in 1929, implementation of the elevated roadway had progressed as far as Midtown by the time that Robert Moses became NYC Parks Commissioner and took a direct interest in local projects 1934. However, Moses created significant works extending from the north and south ends of the West Side Highway, including:

 Henry Hudson Parkway – The West Side Highway becomes the Henry Hudson Parkway just north of 72nd Street thanks to efforts by Moses called the "West Side Improvement."  The parkway does not permit trucks.  The parkway is partially an elevated highway over the rail tracks (now used by Amtrak).
 Brooklyn–Battery Tunnel – The highway hooks into the Brooklyn–Battery Tunnel at its southern end.  Moses had proposed to create the "Brooklyn–Battery Crossing Bridge" but federal intervention obliged Moses to use a tunnel instead.
 Battery Park Underpass connects to FDR Drive.

In the 1960s, Moses proposed straightening the West Side Highway, widening both the highway and the Henry Hudson Parkway, and constructing both the Lower Manhattan Expressway and the Mid-Manhattan Expressways, connecting routes that would have stretched across Manhattan. None of these projects were ever built. Later, in his 80s, he opposed the Westway project, but by that time his power was gone and his ideas generally weren't taken seriously.  Rather than constructing a below-grade interstate highway, Moses proposed merely straightening and rebuilding the West Side Highway south of 59th Street.  Between 59th and 72nd Streets, the site of the former Penn Central 60th Street rail yard, he proposed bringing the highway to grade and moving it eastward to allow for a waterfront park and some housing at the southeast corner of the rail yard.  This was the nucleus of the idea that led to the plan for Riverside South.

1973 collapse
The highway was obsolete almost from the beginning.  Its lanes were considered too narrow and it could not accommodate trucks.  Sharp "S" exit ramps proved hazardous, as did the left-hand exit and entrance lanes that made merging dangerous.

A four-door sedan followed the truck through the hole; neither driver was seriously injured. The next day, both directions were 'indefinitely' closed south of 18th Street. This not only closed off the oldest section (between Canal Street and 18th Street), but also the newest sections (south of Canal Street), because ramps south of the collapse only permitted northbound entrances and southbound exits. The southernmost northbound exit was at 23rd Street.

Westway

In 1971, the Urban Development Corporation (UDC) proposed rebuilding the highway as Interstate 478. UDC's "Water Edge Study" called for the highway to be routed above the water at the ends of the then mostly abandoned piers on the Hudson River and the addition of hundreds of acres of concrete platforms between the bulkhead and the pierhead lines for parks and apartments. It was renamed "Westway" in 1974.

Hugh Carey, who was to become governor, and Ed Koch, who was to become mayor, both campaigned against the plan, saying that it would be a waste of government funds and would be a windfall for private developers. After the two were elected, they both reversed their position and supported the plan.

In 1981, President Ronald Reagan's Department of Transportation and the United States Army Corps of Engineers were on board for the construction with a 1981 price tag of $2.1 billion.

But in 1982, Judge Thomas Griesa of the U.S. District Court blocked the Corps permit, saying the road would harm striped bass.  His order was affirmed by the U.S. Court of Appeals for the Second Circuit. In August 1985, Judge Griesa ruled that state and federal agencies provided tainted testimony regarding the striped bass. At the same time, Congress moved to deny necessary funding for the landfill.

On September 30, 1985, New York City officially gave up on the project, allocating 60 percent of its interstate highway funds to mass transit and setting aside $811 million for the "West Side Highway Replacement Project".

Riverside South

In the 1970s, debates raged about what to do with the elevated section from West 72nd Street and 59th Street. One version of Westway would have continued the buried highway up to the George Washington Bridge, eliminating the elevated section between 59th and 72nd streets, as well as the Henry Hudson Parkway. That option was rejected because of the cost and because it would violate the Blumenthal Amendment, which prohibited any highway construction that would alter Riverside Park. The New York State Department of Transportation (NYSDOT) rejected former parks commissioner Robert Moses's proposal to relocate the elevated section to grade also because of the Blumenthal Amendment as well as the presumed negative effect on development opportunities. Donald Trump, who had an option on the property, seized on Moses's proposal as a way to enhance his development plans, thus negating one of NYSDOT's objections, but his proposed 12,000-unit residential development went nowhere. So NYSDOT planned for a renovation of the viaduct.

A subsequent development project, Lincoln West, accepted the elevated highway, but, although Lincoln West won approval from the City, it failed to obtain financing.  Later, Trump acquired the property and proposed Television City, a design based on a massive 13-block-long podium to hide the elevated highway. Responding to criticism, Trump switched architects, reduced the podium to eight blocks in length, and changed the name to Trump City.

Six civic organizations opposed to Trump City proposed a plan that would relocate and bury the highway in conjunction with a much smaller development and a southward extension of Riverside Park. Trump eventually agreed to this plan, known as Riverside South. After city approval in 1992, work began on the new apartment complex.

As part of the Riverside South agreement, the Urban Development Corporation proceeded with planning and environmental studies for a relocated highway. But relocating and burying the elevated highway section became politically complicated when, at the same time, NYSDOT went ahead with its $70 million project to straighten, widen, and reinforce the viaduct. In 2005 Trump's majority partners sold the project to the Carlyle Group and Extell Development Company. In June 2006, the new developer began construction of a tunnel between 61st and 65th streets for the relocated highway.

West Side Highway Replacement Project

Following the end of the Westway project, there were debates on what to do about the rest of the highway. Vollmer Associates was contracted for the highway replacement project in September 1986. There were four alternatives: three at-grade options with a varying number of lanes and quality of roadway, and one option with grade-separated ramps over busy intersections. By November, a commission was set up to discuss the alternatives. Four days later, several sections of the highway were agreed on. It would be an elevated highway north of 49th Street; an at-grade roadway between 44th and 25th Streets, including a depressed northbound roadway from 32nd to 42nd Streets; a tunnel under a park between 20th and 25th Streets; an at-grade boulevard between 20th and Houston Streets; an at-grade road with a 3-lane elevated ramp between Houston and Harrison Streets; and a 9-lane boulevard with depressed ramps through Battery Park City. There would be 26 traffic lights. This proposal was assailed by mass-transit associations, environmental groups, and elected officials.

In January 1987, the commission unanimously agreed to build the highway as a six-lane urban boulevard with a parkway-style median and decorative lightposts. There would be a  $100 million park on the highway's western periphery, the latter of which was criticized by Governor Mario Cuomo as being too expensive. Afterward, there were some delays caused by Cuomo's reluctance to prioritize the project. In the meantime, the old, abandoned highway was being used by squatters. One of the first options to be rejected in 1989 was the construction of a boulevard on landfill, which was the reason for Westway's cancellation. There were also proposals for "cove" developments alongside the future boulevard.

Construction began in early 1996 on the West Side Highway project. The first of the project's seven segments—between Clarkson and Horatio streets in the Greenwich Village neighborhood—was completed in 1998.

Construction of the West Side Highway Replacement Project was completed between the Battery and 59th Street in August 2001. The period between the 1973 collapse and the 1985 demise of Westway was a chaotic time for drivers as the original elevated highway was dismantled (finally in 1989) and traffic was rerouted to temporary highways.  The new highway permits trucks, which the old elevated did not.  Together with the northern Henry Hudson Parkway, it creates a leafy boulevard along the Hudson River from the northern tip to the southern tip of Manhattan.

Hudson River Park

Legislation in June 1998 followed an agreement by Mayor Rudolph Giuliani and Governor George Pataki to create the Hudson River Park on the west side of the highway from West 59th to the Battery. A bicycle path running the length of the highway to Battery Park City was one of the first additions. Piers are currently being refurbished and other work continues, with Pier 84 as the largest.

Joe DiMaggio Highway
Even though the highway has had two other official names, the official names have never stuck. The first official name was the Miller Highway, in honor of the city council president who pushed for the highway. On March 30, 1999, at the urging of Mayor Giuliani, the highway was renamed for legendary New York Yankees player Joe DiMaggio, who had died three weeks earlier.  Legislation to rename the highway had been introduced before DiMaggio died. Giuliani championed the name change because the highway would have been the approach to the proposed West Side Stadium at the highway and 32nd Street. DiMaggio lived on Manhattan's east side.

Signs bearing the new, ceremonial name of the highway were erected on April 25, 1999. This was in the midst of a reconstruction, finished on March 29, 2002, after the September 11 attacks in 2001 destroyed part of the road, which was still being rebuilt. Only minimal signage for the new name was erected as a result, while "West Side Highway" signs abound.

September 11, 2001, and aftermath

Completion of the project was originally set for October 2001, but it was delayed for years due to damage caused by the September 11 attacks. The highway, which runs just west of the World Trade Center, played a major role in the September 11, 2001 attacks and its aftermath.  The famous flag raising photograph by Thomas E. Franklin of The Record took place by the highway on the northwest corner of the site. In addition, three chunks of the tower that crashed into the highway were used in iconic pictures of the day. Emergency personnel went down the West Side Highway and were greeted by cheering crowds at Christopher Street on their return.  Virtually all the debris from the Center traveled up the West Side Highway to be shipped off by barge.  For the last half of the month, out-of-town ambulances waited on the highway for a chance to help injured patients.

There was debate over whether to rebuild the damaged section of the road as a surface street or a tunnel. As a master plan was developed for Ground Zero, plans initially called for the West Side Highway to be buried in a tunnel between the site and Battery Park City that was expected to cost $1 billion. Goldman Sachs, which had planned to build its headquarters in Battery Park City, announced its intention to cancel those plans because of concerns about the traffic pattern and long-term construction disruptions. This prompted New York Governor George Pataki to cancel the tunnel project in favor of a boulevard. The boulevard was finished by 2014.

In 2004, the police forces of both the PANYNJ and the NYPD announced concerns that the proposed One World Trade Center would be too close to the West Side Highway and thus vulnerable to car bombs.  This prompted a total redesign of the tower and the relocation of its site away from the highway.

There used to be four West Street pedestrian bridges, two of them erected after the September 11 attacks. A below-grade crossing of the West Side Highway connecting the Brookfield Place (formerly the World Financial Center) complex and the Concourse level of the World Trade Center opened in October 2013, allowing the pedestrian bridge adjacent to Vesey Street to be removed.

On October 31, 2017, a man intentionally drove a pickup truck for a mile through the Hudson River Park's bike path, parallel to the West Side Highway, between Houston Street and Chambers Street, killing eight people and injuring at least 11. In 2022, Manhattan borough president Mark Levine proposed converting one lane of the West Side Highway into a bike path due to heavy traffic on Hudson River Park's bike lane.

Major intersections
Despite being a surface road, with many at-grade intersections and traffic lights, some of the intersections are given exit numbers.

See also
 West Side Highway pedestrian bridges, a group of pedestrian bridges that cross the highway

References

External links

 Video – Westway Lecture at The Skyscraper Museum (2014)
 NYCroads.com – West Side Highway (NY 9A)

 
Streets in Manhattan
Freeways in the United States
Eleventh Avenue (Manhattan)